"Elliot's Song" is a song by American singers Dominic Fike and Zendaya, released as a single from the season two soundtrack and score album of American TV series Euphoria on March 4, 2022. It was written by Labrinth, his girlfriend Muzhda "Muz" Zemar-McKenzie, and Zendaya. The song was included in a longer version in the season two finale of Euphoria. At the 74th Primetime Emmy Awards, the song was nominated for Outstanding Original Music and Lyrics.

Background
The ballad was performed on acoustic guitar by Fike's character Elliot in the season two finale of Euphoria, in which he "serenaded" Rue (Zendaya). The scene received criticism and was made into a meme due to its length. The single version of the track includes lines sung by Zendaya.

The single release uses the same photograph of Zendaya for its cover art as "I'm Tired", a song also used in the finale released as a single the week prior.

Charts

References

2022 singles
2022 songs
Dominic Fike songs
Song recordings produced by Labrinth
Songs from television series
Songs written by Labrinth
Zendaya songs